Eyre Bird Observatory is an educational, scientific and recreational facility in the Nuytsland Nature Reserve, Western Australia. 
Cocklebiddy is the nearest locality on the Eyre Highway,  to the north. It is in the Hampton bioregion, which is sandwiched between the Nullarbor Plain to the north and the Great Australian Bight to the south, in one of the least populated places on the Australian continent. It was established in 1977 by Birds Australia in the disused Eyre Telegraph Station as Australia's first bird observatory, to provide a base for the study and enjoyment of the birds of the area.

Western Australia's official lowest temperature of −7.2 °C (19.0 °F) was recorded at Eyre Bird Observatory on 17 August 2008.

History

During their nearly  journey overland from Adelaide to Albany in 1841, 26-year-old Edward John Eyre and his party - companion John Baxter and three Aboriginal men - found fresh water  beneath a coastal sand dune, and camped there for a month, recovering from severe dehydration and exhaustion. This location became known as Eyre's Sand Patch.

When the Inter-Colonial Telegraph Line reached the Patch in 1877, a weatherboard and corrugated iron building was erected to house a permanently manned repeater station, and the location was subsequently known as the Eyre Telegraph Station.

Fifty years later, in 1977, the limestone building was restored by volunteers with the support of the Post Office Historical Society and Birds Australia, using materials supplied by the WA Department of Fisheries and Wildlife, and it now functions as a permanent bird observatory. The building is maintained by volunteers, including two caretakers who live on site for three months at a time.

Birdlife
Honeyeaters who spend the summer in the deep south-west extend their range north and east in the winter to feast on the flowering mallee and, at Eyre, honeyeaters, silvereyes and other species are found wintering in the narrow coastal mallee strip. A breeding colony of little penguins spends the summer west of Eyre at Twilight Cove. By 2008, 245 bird species had been recorded in the surrounding nature reserve.

Climate
Eyre Bird Observatory has a semi-arid climate (BSk) with warm-to-hot dry summers and mild-to-cool wetter winters. Factors that cause the lower minimum temperatures despite the observatory being within  of the coast include its sandy surface, its location in a shallow depression, and a sand ridge between it and the ocean that cuts it off from shallow  marine air masses on calm nights.

References

Further reading
 Eyre Bird Observatory report. Perth, Western Australia : Royal Australasian Ornithologists' Union, Western Australian Group, 1970s – 1980s

External links
 Google Maps satellite view
 Birds Australia Eyre Bird Observatory page
 WA Dept of Environment and Conservation Eyre Bird Observatory page
 Shire of Dundas Eyre Highway page

Buildings and structures in Western Australia
Nullarbor Plain
Bird observatories in Australia
1977 establishments in Australia
Tourist attractions in Western Australia
Great Australian Bight
Birdwatching sites in Australia
State Register of Heritage Places in the Shire of Dundas
Hampton bioregion
Nuytsland Nature Reserve